Jan Kosak (born 3 February 1992) is a Czech footballer midfielder, who currently plays for FC Vysočina Jihlava.

References

External links
 
 

1992 births
Living people
Czech footballers
Czech Republic youth international footballers
Czech First League players
FC Vysočina Jihlava players
FC Sellier & Bellot Vlašim players
Association football midfielders